Invergordon Football Club are a senior football club from Invergordon in the Scottish Highlands. They compete in the North Caledonian Football League and play at the Recreation Grounds.

Origins 
Although the exact year the club was formed is unknown, the first mentions of an Invergordon Football Club are made in local newspapers around 1870. Invergordon were founder members of the Ross-shire Junior FA in 1894 and first competed for silverware for the Ross-shire Junior Cup in 1895.

They remained regular competitors in the Ross-shire Junior ranks either side of the First World War.

Post-War History 
Invergordon joined the North of Scotland Junior FA (later renamed to the North Caledonian League) immediately after the Second World War, winning the league championship in their first season. By the 1950s, they had attained full membership and have remained members of the league (with the exception of a handful of seasons) since that time.

In June 2022, following their North Caledonian League victory, it was announced that they would be making their debut appearance in the Scottish Cup Preliminary Round, being the first North Caledonian League side other than Golspie Sutherland to get the chance to participate in the trophy, losing 5–1 at the Global Energy Stadium to Newtongrange Star.

Ground 
The club's original ground was the old "Blackpark" (now part of Invergordon Distillery), before they moved to their current playing field at the town's Recreation Grounds.

Club colours 
Invergordon were originally known as the "Maroons" with their first kit donated by Plymouth Argyle. Their colours have been changed on several occasions before settling on yellow and royal blue for a number of years. In 2016, the club adopted new club colours of white and blue.

Honours
North Caledonian League
Champions: 1946–47, 1976–77, 1987–88, 2001–02, 2016–17, 2021–22
North Caledonian Cup 
Winners: 1987–88, 2018–19
Football Times Cup
Winners: 1974–75, 1975–76, 1987–88, 1989–90, 1990–91, 1999–00, 2005–06, 2016–17, 2022–23
Jock Mackay Cup
Winners: 2017–18, 2018–19
Chic Allan Cup
Winners: 1988–89
MacNicol Trophy
Winners: 1968–69, 1974–75, 1976–77
Ness Cup
Winners: 1972–73, 1976–77
Morris Newton / SWL Cup
Winners: 1989–90, 1997–98

References

External links
 Twitter

Football clubs in Scotland
North Caledonian Football League teams
Association football clubs established in 1910
1910 establishments in Scotland
Football in Highland (council area)
Invergordon